The eastern golden frog (Pelophylax plancyi) is a species of true frog found in eastern and northeastern China. It is closely related to the Seoul frog, Pelophylax chosenicus and to P. fukienensis, both initially described as subspecies of P. plancyi.

Eastern golden frog is a medium to large-sized frog, with males reaching  and females  length.

References

Pelophylax
Amphibians of China
Endemic fauna of China
Amphibians described in 1880